Filmsaaz is an international short film festival that began in 2008 by the University Film Club, Aligarh Muslim University. Until the fifth edition of the festival in 2012, it was a national-level competition, but beginning with the sixth edition in 2013, the festival was opened to international entries.   Since its inception, the University's Kennedy Auditorium has been used as the festival's screening venue.

History
The film club was established in the 1973–74 academic session. The proposal was mooted with the University Grants Commission that film societies be established with the universities in India which was accepted and thus the film club was the outcome of such a proposal.

In 2013, after having conducted film workshop there, actor Adil Hussain was granted a lifetime membership in the university's film club.

A short film festival- Filmsaaz was conceived and begun in 2008 by the then secretary Adil Hossain. In 2013, under the secretary-ship of Arif Jwadder the 6th edition of the festival become international in scope. When first established, the festival was organized as a national short film festival with national and local categories but with its sixth installation, local categories were removed.

Editions

References

Short film festivals in India
Aligarh Muslim University
Film festivals established in 2008